Wang Renhua (born 1962) is a vice admiral (zhongjiang) of the People's Liberation Army (PLA) and the current secretary of the Political and Legal Affairs Commission of the Central Military Commission.

Biography
Born in 1962, Wang served in the Political Work Bureau of the Equipment Development Department of the Central Military Commission before being appointed director of Political Department of Jiuquan Satellite Launch Center in 2012. In January 2015, he became director of the Political Department of the Army Equipment Research and Ordering Division of the Equipment Development Department of the Central Military Commission, but having held the position for only one year, then he was made deputy director of the PLA Army Political Work Department. In January 2017, he was secretary of Commission for Discipline Inspection of the East Sea Fleet, the party's agency in charge of anti-corruption efforts. In 2018, he became deputy secretary of the Political and Legal Affairs Commission of the Central Military Commission, rising to secretary in December 2019.

He was promoted to the rank of rear admiral (Shaojiang) in 2013 and vice admiral (zhongjiang) in December 2019. 

In October 2022, Wang was elected as a full member of the 20th Central Committee of the Communist Party of China.

References

1962 births
Living people
People's Liberation Army generals